This article contains a list of the most studied restriction enzymes whose names start with Bsa to Bso inclusive. It contains approximately 90 enzymes.
The following information is given:



Whole list navigation

Restriction enzymes

Bsa - Bso

Notes

Biotechnology
Restriction enzyme cutting sites
Restriction enzymes